The Broomfield Enterprise is the city newspaper for Broomfield, Colorado, United States, and is published once a week on Sundays. It is published by Prairie Mountain Publishing, which is owned by MediaNews Group.

The Enterprise was founded in 1975. The founding editor was Roseann Doran. Mr. and Mrs Albert Martin sold the paper in 1979 to the Minneapolis Star & Tribune Co. The circulation at the time was 12,000.

In 1991, Cowles Media Co. of Minneapolis sold the weekly newspapers it owned in the Denver suburbs, known as the Sentinel chain, in five pieces, in a transaction described as "intricate." The papers had been struggling financially, and the sale price was "greatly reduced" from what Cowles had initially sought. The Boulder Publishing Company, which published The Daily Camera, purchased the Enterprise.

The 1994 resignation of Broomfield mayor Bob Schulze was attributed to the Enterprise's reporting on his personal use of a city-issued cell phone, which had resulted in $5,707 of charges.

As of 1995 it was owned by Boulder Publishing, along with The Daily Camera. It was delivered free to residents, and was described as having strong coverage of government, business, schools, and sports. In 1997 it was listed as one of the holdings of Knight Ridder. That year E. W. Scripps acquired the parent company.

The Enterprise's local news coverage has been picked up and credited by other newspapers.

References

Newspapers published in Colorado
Broomfield, Colorado